JoNell Bakke is a former Democratic-NPL member of the North Dakota Senate from the 43rd district located in the Grand Forks area. Bakke previously served in the North Dakota Senate during the 60th Legislative Assembly from 2006 to 2010. A retired special education teacher, Bakke earned her Bachelor of Science and Master of Education at the University of North Dakota.

In the November 2018 election, Bakke defeated Senator Lonnie Laffen by six percentage points.

References

External links
 Biography from North Dakota Legislative Assembly

21st-century American politicians
21st-century American women politicians
Living people
Democratic Party North Dakota state senators
Women state legislators in North Dakota
Schoolteachers from North Dakota
University of North Dakota alumni
Year of birth missing (living people)